Summit Bridge (or simply Summit) is an unincorporated community in New Castle County, Delaware, United States. Summit Bridge is home to Summit Airport, located five miles north of the central business district of Middletown. Summit Bridge is located south of the Summit Bridge over the Chesapeake and Delaware Canal.

References

Unincorporated communities in New Castle County, Delaware
Unincorporated communities in Delaware